Cycas elongata is a species of cycad endemic to southern Vietnam.

Distribution
The four main subpopulations of Cycas elongata are found in:

northern Ninh Thuan Province
west of Cam Ranh in Khanh Hoa Province
Song Cau in Phu Yen Province
the Cu Mong Pass area on the boundary between Phu Yen Province and Binh Dinh Province
Lạc Nghiệp hamlet, Cà Ná commune, Thuận Nam District, Ninh Thuận Province (southwest of Phan Rang; found in 1994)

References

elongata